Jay Lacopo (born 1963) is an American film actor and screenwriter. He is probably best known for having appeared in and written the script for The Third Wheel (2002), starring Luke Wilson.

He wrote the script for I Killed My Lesbian Wife, Hung Her on a Meat Hook, and Now I Have a Three-Picture Deal at Disney (1993) and the animated movie Bartok the Magnificent from 1999.

Filmography

Actor
Turning It Over (2004) as Steve
The Third Wheel (2002) as Phil
Crossing Cords (2001) as Leader
The Godson (1998) as Studio Executive
Lycanthrophobia (1998) as Frank
Almost Heroes (1998) as Hector
Speed 2: Cruise Control (1997) as Real Estate Salesman
Glory Daze (1996) as The Bus Driver
Partners as Handsome overcoat, Sir (1 episode, 1995)
Do We Have to Write You a Check? (1995) TV Episode as Handsome overcoat, Sir
Home Improvement as Customer (1 episode, 1995)
A Marked Man (1995) TV Episode as Customer
Two Guys Talkin' About Girls (1995) (V) as Crazy Man on PhoneI Killed My Lesbian Wife, Hung Her on a Meat Hook, and Now I Have a Three-Picture Deal at Disney (1993) as The Director

WriterThe Third Wheel (2002)Bartok the Magnificent (1999)I Killed My Lesbian Wife, Hung Her on a Meat Hook, and Now I Have a Three-Picture Deal at Disney (1993)

ProducerAll Grown Up (2003) (TV)

ThanksThere's Something About Mary (1998)Good Will Hunting'' (1997)

References

Living people
1963 births
American male screenwriters
21st-century American male actors
Place of birth missing (living people)